Out of the Blues is the nineteenth studio album by American singer-songwriter Boz Scaggs. The album, a mixture of vintage classics and four original compositions by close friend Jack "Applejack" Walroth, is the last in a trilogy that began with 2013's Memphis and continued with 2015's A Fool to Care. The album contains songs by blues musicians including Bobby "Blue" Bland, Jimmy Reed, Magic Sam, and Neil Young. It was released on July 27, 2018, on Concord Records. It reached number one on the Billboard Top Blues Albums chart.

Critical reception 

The Associated Press writes, "Sometimes with more gloss, at times with more grit, but always with great feeling, Boz Scaggs has kept some form of the blues close to the surface during most of his career, which has already sailed past the 50-year milestone."

Something Else writes that Scaggs is, "three for three. Long past the hit-making phenomena of the Silk Degrees years, Scaggs is still providing some very good reasons to keep listening to him."

Charles Donovan on Pop Matters writes, "Despite its title, on Out of the Blues, Scaggs actually takes the listener back into the blues. For the third time in a row, he deftly avoids the pitfalls of making these sorts of albums by selecting unpredictable material. In fact, almost half the album is made up of new songs written by musician/friend, Jack Walroth." He continues, "The Walroth material absolutely sparkles, with 'Rock and Stick,' the album opener, having the heat and smoothness of a sports car in the sun, and the kind of groove that will satisfy fans of Silk Degrees. Scagg's voice is affected by age but not to its detriment. It's the same voice with rougher edges, and rougher edges only serve to enhance this kind of music."

Track listing 

Target exclusive bonus tracks

Japan issue bonus tracks

Personnel 
 Boz Scaggs – lead vocals, producer, guitars, backing vocals, bass guitar, vocoder
 Jack "Applejack" Walroth – harmonica
 Ray Parker Jr. – guitars
 Doyle Bramhall II – guitars
 Charlie Sexton – guitars
 Willie Weeks – bass
 Ricky Fataar – drums
 Jim Keltner – drums
 Jim Cox – keyboards
 Chris Phelps – photography

Chart positions

References

2018 albums
Boz Scaggs albums
Albums produced by Boz Scaggs